Jean Iris Ross Cockburn (7 May 1911 – 27 April 1973) was a British journalist, political activist, and film critic. During the Spanish Civil War (1936–39), she was a war correspondent for the Daily Express and is alleged to have been a press agent for Joseph Stalin's Comintern. A skilled writer, Ross worked as a film critic for the Daily Worker and her criticisms of early Soviet cinema were later described by scholars as ingenious works of "dialectical sophistry". Throughout her life, she wrote political criticism, anti-fascist polemics, and socialist manifestos for a number of disparate organisations such as the British Workers' Film and Photo League. She was a devout Stalinist and a lifelong member of the Communist Party of Great Britain.

During her itinerant youth in the Weimar Republic, Ross was a cabaret singer and aspiring film actress in Berlin. Her escapades inspired the heroine in Christopher Isherwood's 1937 novella Sally Bowles which was later collected in Goodbye to Berlin, a work cited by literary critics as deftly capturing the hedonistic nihilism of the Weimar era and later adapted into the stage musical Cabaret. In the 1937 novella, Sally is a British flapper who moonlights as a chanteuse during the twilight of the Jazz Age. After a series of failed romances, she becomes pregnant and has an abortion facilitated by the novella's narrator. Isherwood based many of the novella's details upon actual events in Ross' life, including her abortion. Fearing a libel suit, Isherwood delayed publication of the work until given Ross' explicit permission.

For the remainder of her life, Ross believed the public association of herself with the naïve and apolitical character of Bowles occluded her lifelong work as a professional writer and political activist. Her daughter Sarah Caudwell, who shared this belief, later wrote a newspaper article in an attempt to correct the historical record and to dispel misconceptions about Ross. According to Caudwell, "in the transformations of the novel for stage and cinema the characterisation of Sally has become progressively cruder and less subtle and the stories about 'the original' correspondingly more high-coloured".

In addition to inspiring the character Sally Bowles, Ross is credited by the Oxford Dictionary of National Biography and other sources as the muse for lyricist Eric Maschwitz's jazz standard "These Foolish Things (Remind Me of You)", one of the 20th century's most enduring love songs. Although Maschwitz's estranged wife Hermione Gingold later claimed the song was written for herself or actor Anna May Wong, Maschwitz contradicted these claims. Instead, Maschwitz cited memories of a "young love", and most scholars posit Maschwitz's youthful affair with Ross inspired the song.

Early life and education 

Jean Ross was raised in luxury at Maison Ballassiano in the British protectorate of Alexandria, Egypt, She was the eldest daughter of Charles Ross (1880–1938), a Scottish cotton classifier for the Bank of Egypt and brought up with her four siblings in a staunchly liberal, anti-Tory household.

Ross was educated in England at Leatherhead Court, Surrey. As an unusually intelligent pupil who had completed the sixth form curricula by the age of 16, she was profoundly bored and loathed school. She became openly rebellious when informed she must remain at school for another year to repeat her already completed coursework. To gain her freedom, she feigned a teenage pregnancy and was summoned to appear before the school's stern headmistress:

She falsely insisted to the headmistress that she was pregnant and the Leatherhead Court schoolmasters sequestered the teenager in a nearby insane asylum until a relative arrived and retrieved her. When they discovered the pregnancy was feigned, Ross was formally expelled. Exasperated by her defiant behaviour, her parents sent her abroad to Pensionnat Mistral, an elite Swiss finishing school in Neuchâtel. Ross, however, was either expelled or fled the school.

Using a trust stipend provided by her grandfather Charles Caudwell, who was an affluent industrialist and landowner, the teenage Ross returned to England and enrolled in the Royal Academy of Dramatic Art (RADA), London. After diligently applying herself in her first year, she won a coveted acting prize that gave her the opportunity to play the lead role in any production of her choice. When she selected the difficult role of Phaedra, she was informed her youth precluded such a tragic role because she lacked the requisite life experience. Hurt by this refusal, Ross left the academy after one year to pursue a film career.

In 1930, at nineteen years of age, Ross and fellow Egyptian-born Hungarian actor Marika Rökk obtained cinematic roles portraying a harem houri in director Monty Banks' Why Sailors Leave Home, an early sound comedy that was filmed in London. Ross's dark complexion and partial fluency in Arabic were deemed suitable for the role. Disappointed with their small roles, she and Rökk heard rumours about ample job opportunities for aspiring actors in the Weimar Republic of Germany and set off with great expectations for Central Europe.

Weimar Berlin 

Ross's excursion to Central Europe proved less successful than she had hoped. Unable to find acting work, she worked as a nightclub singer in Weimar Germany, ostensibly in lesbian bars and second-rate cabarets. When not singing or modelling, she often visited the offices of the UFA GmbH, a German motion picture production company, in the hopes of gaining small film roles. By late 1931, she obtained a job as a dancer in theatre director Max Reinhardt's production of Offenbach's  Tales of Hoffmann, and played Anitra in Reinhardt's production of Peer Gynt.

Reinhardt's much-anticipated production of Tales of Hoffmann premiered on 28 November 1931. The production was reputedly one of the last great triumphs of the Berlin theatre scene prior to the Nazi Party's gradual ascent. Ross and a male dancer appeared together as an amorous couple in the stage background, and were visible only in silhouette during the Venetian palace sequence of the second act. Later, Ross said she and the male performer had capitalised on this opportunity for sexual intimacy in full view of the unsuspecting audience.

Meeting Isherwood 
By late 1931, Ross had moved to Schöneberg, Berlin, where she shared modest lodgings in Fräulein Meta Thurau's flat at Nollendorfstraße 17 with English writer Christopher Isherwood, whom she had met in October 1930 or early 1931. Isherwood, who was an apprentice novelist, was politically ambivalent about the rise of fascism and had moved to Berlin in order to avail himself of male prostitutes and to enjoy the city's orgiastic Jazz Age cabarets. At their first meeting, Ross monopolised the conversation and recounted her latest sexual conquests. At one point, she reached into her handbag and produced a diaphragm,  which she waved in the face of a startled Isherwood. The two soon became intimate friends.

Although Ross' relations with Isherwood were not always amicable, she soon joined Isherwood's social circle alongside more politically-aware poets W.H. Auden and Stephen Spender. Subsequently, Ross was the only woman in this circle of gay male writers, who mythologised her in their respective memoirs. Among Isherwood's acquaintances, Ross was regarded as a sexual libertine who was devoid of inhibitions and had no qualms about entertaining visitors to their flat while nude or about discussing her sexual relations. A contemporary portrait of the 19-year-old Ross appears in Isherwood's Goodbye to Berlin when the narrator first encounters the "divinely decadent" Sally Bowles:

Isherwood further described the youthful Ross as having a physical resemblance to Merle Oberon but said her face naturally had a sardonic humour akin to that of comedian Beatrice Lillie. Their ramshackle flat at Nollendorfstraße 17 was in a working-class district near the centre of Weimar Berlin's radical enclaves, subversive activity, and gay nightlife. By day, Ross was a fashion model for popular magazines, and by night, she was a bohemian chanteuse singing in the nearby cabarets located along the Kurfürstendamm avenue, an entertainment-vice district that was selected for future destruction by Joseph Goebbels in his 1928 journal. These cabarets would be closed by the Brownshirts when the Nazi Party seized power in early 1933. Isherwood visited these nightclubs to hear Ross sing; he later described her voice as poor but nonetheless effective:

Due to her acquaintance with Isherwood, Ross would later become immortalised as "a bittersweet English hoyden" named Sally Bowles in Isherwood's 1937 eponymous novella and his 1939 book Goodbye to Berlin. While in Isherwood's company, Ross was introduced to the visiting Paul Bowles, a bisexual American writer who would later gain acclaim for his post-colonial novel The Sheltering Sky. This meeting between Ross and Paul Bowles made an impression upon Isherwood, who later used Bowles' surname for the character Sally Bowles, whom he based upon Ross. Isherwood said Ross was "more essentially British than Sally; she grumbled like a true Englishwoman, with her 'grin-and-bear-it' grin. And she was tougher".

Abortion incident 

Although Isherwood sometimes had sex with women, Ross—unlike the fictional character Sally—never tried to seduce Isherwood, although they were forced to share a bed whenever their flat became overcrowded with visiting revelers. Instead, Isherwood settled into a same-sex relationship with a young, working-class, German man named Heinz Neddermeyer, while Ross entered into a variety of heterosexual liaisons, including one with the tall, blond, musician Götz von Eick, who later became an actor under the stage name Peter van Eyck and future star of Henri-Georges Clouzot's The Wages of Fear. Although some biographers identified van Eyck as Jewish, others posit van Eyck was the wealthy scion of Prussian landowners in Pomerania. As a Pomeranian aristocrat, he was expected by his family to embark upon a military career but he became interested in jazz as a young man and pursued musical studies in Berlin.

When the 19-year-old van Eyck met Ross, he often moonlighted as a jazz pianist in Berlin cabarets. Either during their brief relationship or soon after their separation, Ross realised she was pregnant. As a personal favour to Ross, Isherwood pretended to be her heterosexual impregnator to facilitate an abortion procedure. Ross nearly died as a result of the abortion procedure due to the carelessness of the doctor. Following the procedure, Isherwood visited an ailing Ross in a Berlin hospital. Wrongly assuming the shy gay author to be her heterosexual partner, the hospital staff despised him for callously forcing Ross to undergo a near-fatal abortion. These tragicomic events later inspired Isherwood to write his 1937 novella Sally Bowles and serves as its narrative climax.

Departure from Germany 
While Ross recovered from the botched abortion procedure, the political situation rapidly deteriorated in Weimar Germany as the incipient Nazi Party continued to grow stronger day by day. By 1932, Weimar Germany was in the trough of an economic depression, with millions of persons unemployed. Nearly every German they encountered "was poor, living from hand to mouth on little money". Berlin residents experienced "poverty, unemployment, political demonstrations and street fighting between the forces of the extreme left and the extreme right".

As the political climate deteriorated, Ross, Isherwood, Spender, and others realised they must leave Germany. "There was a sensation of doom to be felt in the Berlin streets", Spender recalled. In the July 1932 elections, the Nazis achieved a plurality in the Reichstag and, by August that year, Ross departed Germany and returned to southern England. Despite Ross leaving Germany, Isherwood chose to remain due to his close attachment to Heinz Neddermeyer. However, after Adolf Hitler's ascension as Chancellor of Germany on 30 January 1933, Isherwood realised that staying any longer in Germany would be perilous. He commented to a friend: "Adolf, with his rectangular black moustache, has come to stay and brought all his friends.... Nazis are to be enrolled as 'auxiliary police,' which means that one must now not only be murdered but that it is illegal to offer any resistance." Two weeks after Hitler passed the Enabling Act which cemented his power, Isherwood fled Germany and returned to England on 5 April 1933.

Ultimately, the increasing prevalence of xenophobic Nazism in the country would preclude Ross and Isherwood from returning to their beloved Berlin. Many of the Berlin cabaret denizens whom Ross and Isherwood befriended would later flee abroad or die in labour camps.

Activities in London

Joining the Communist Party 

After her return to southern England, Ross resided at Cheyne Walk in Chelsea, London, and continued to fraternise with Isherwood and his circle of friends. She also began to associate with left-wing political activists "who were humorous but dedicated, sexually permissive but politically dogmatic". During this period, she met Claud Cockburn, an Anglo-Scots journalist and the second cousin, once removed, of novelists Alec Waugh and Evelyn Waugh.

They met at the Café Royal. Purportedly, one evening, Cockburn handed Ross a cheque but perhaps having second thoughts, he telephoned the next morning to warn her the cheque would bounce. Despite this "portent of unreliability" and "the fact that Cockburn had already been married to an American woman whom he left when she became pregnant", Ross began an affair with Cockburn. On a subsequent evening, Cockburn expounded Marxist economic theory to Ross all night until the early morning hours. Cockburn later said he persuaded Ross to become a left-wing journalist and secured her employment at the Daily Worker.

Due to Cockburn's influence, Ross joined the Communist Party of Great Britain (CPGB) during the tenure of General Secretary Harry Pollitt. She became an active and devoted Party member for the remainder of her life. Meanwhile, she continued her career as an aspiring thespian, appearing in theatrical productions at the Gate Theatre Studio that were directed by Peter Godfrey and, in need of money, she modelled the latest Paris fashions by French designer Jean Patou in Tatler magazine. It is possible, although unlikely, she obtained a bit role as a chorus girl in Paramount Studios' musical drama film Rumba.

Isherwood and Viertel 

While in England, Ross' connections to the British film industry proved crucial to Isherwood's future career. Ross had spent only around eighteen months in Berlin between 1932 and 1933 but became fluent enough in German to allow her to obtain work as a bilingual scenarist with Austro-German directors who had fled the Nazi regime. One of these Austrian directors was Berthold Viertel, who became Ross' friend.

At the time, translators were sorely needed in the film industry to facilitate productions headed by Austro-German directors who were now working in the United Kingdom. Ross, who was aware Isherwood was living in poverty,  persuaded Viertel to hire him as a translator. As repayment for this favour, Ross asked Isherwood to promise to give half of his first week's salary from the job to her. After obtaining the job, Isherwood either reneged upon or forgot this agreement with Ross, and this incident may have contributed to the souring of their friendship. Viertel and Isherwood soon collaborated upon a film that would become Little Friend (1934); this collaboration launched Isherwood's long career as a screenwriter in Hollywood.

During 1933, Isherwood composed the nucleus of a story about Ross' abortion in Berlin that would later become his 1937 novella Sally Bowles. Dissatisfied with its structure and quality, Isherwood rewrote the manuscript during subsequent years, and he eventually sent the manuscript to editor John Lehmann to be published in New Writing, a new literary periodical. When Isherwood informed Lehmann his story was based on factual events, the editor became worried about the story's climax because it draws upon Ross' abortion. Lehmann feared Ross would file a libel suit against Isherwood and himself if the story was published.

Anxious to avoid a libel suit, Isherwood implored Ross to give him permission to publish the story. Ross' reluctance delayed the publication of the manuscript. Because abortion was a controversial topic in 1930s England and carried the penalty of life imprisonment, Ross feared Isherwood's thinly-disguised story recounting her lifestyle and abortion in Berlin would further strain her difficult relationship with her status-conscious family.

To prevail upon Ross to give consent for the novella's publication, Isherwood said he was in the direst financial circumstances. Ross, who herself was often impoverished, sympathised with any friend in a similar situation. As a personal favour to Isherwood, she yielded her objections to the publication of Sally Bowles, which was then published by Hogarth Press. Following the tremendous success of the novella, Ross regretted this decision and believed it permanently harmed her reputation. Now deeply committed to the socialist cause, Ross noticed Isherwood's story undermined her standing "among those comrades who realised she was the model for Sally Bowles".

Workers' League, and embezzlement 
Around 1934 and 1935, Ross wrote a manifesto for the short-lived British Workers' Film and Photo League (BWFPL) and served as its General Secretary. Much like its communist-backed US counterpart, the BWFPL's main objective was to launch a cultural counter-offensive to the "bourgeois" and "nauseating" films produced in capitalist societies such as the United States and the United Kingdom. The organisation sought to take anti-capitalist "revolutionary films to workers organisations throughout the country". Despite its limited personnel and modest funds, the League produced newsreels, taught seminars on working-class film criticism, organised protests against "reactionary pictures", and screened the latest blockbusters of Soviet Russia to cadres of like-minded cineastes. The BWFPL frequently screened such motion pictures as Storm over Asia (1928), Ten Days That Shook the World (1928), Road to Life (1931), and China Express (1929).

During Ross' tenure as General Secretary, the BWFLP was closely tied to the Friends of the Soviet Union, to which it often sublet its office space. After her resignation as the League's Secretary, Ross continued to serve as a League member and helped produce the short film Defence of Britain in March 1936. Drawing upon her family's resources, Ross personally donated a considerable sum to the fledgling organisation in February 1936. Another League member named Ivan Seruya, however, embezzled the majority of Ross' donation to finance his own private venture International Sound Films. This incident and the subsequent dearth of organisational funds reportedly contributed to the League's lack of progress and to its demise in 1938.

Film criticism for the Daily Worker 

Between 1935 and 1936, Ross worked as a film critic for the Communist newspaper Daily Worker using the alias Peter Porcupine, which she presumably adopted as a homage to radical English pamphleteer William Cobbett, who had used the same pseudonym. Ross' interest in film criticism purportedly began in Berlin when she often attended the cinema with Isherwood, Auden, and Spender. According to Spender, their quartet of friends collectively viewed  such films as Robert Wiene's The Cabinet of Dr. Caligari, Fritz Lang's Metropolis, and Josef von Sternberg's The Blue Angel. They were particularly fond of "heroic proletarian films" such as G.W. Pabst's Comradeship as well as "Russian films in which photography created poetic images of labour and industry", which is exemplified in Ten Days That Shook the World and The Battleship Potemkin. Fellow critic Dwight Macdonald described this period as spanning the Golden Age and Iron Age of Soviet cinema:

In her film criticism, Ross insisted "the workers in the Soviet Union [had] introduced to the world" new variations of this art form with "the electrifying strength and vitality and freedom of a victorious working class". Her reviews of early Soviet cinema were later described by scholars as "ingenious piece[s] of dialectical sophistry".

Eve of the Spanish Civil War 

In mid-September 1936, while the Spanish Civil War was in its first year, Ross purportedly met English poet and communist John Cornford at the Horseshoes pub in England while in the company of his friend John Sommerfield. As the first English volunteer to enlist against Francisco Franco's forces, Cornford had just returned from the Aragon front, where he had served with the POUM militia near Saragossa, and fought in the early battles near Perdiguera and Huesca. Cornford then returned to England from Barcelona to recruit volunteers to combat the fascists in Spain.

Following the initial meeting between Ross and Cornford, a near brawl occurred at the pub when an ex-fascist volunteer who had been in the Irish Brigade was present and almost came to blows with Cornford over the subject of the war. After leaving the pub, Cornford and Ross went for dinner to Bertorelli's on Charlotte Street in Fitzrovia, central London, where Ross impressed Cornford with her knowledge of ongoing political matters in Spain, as well as between England and Germany. By the end of the evening, Cornford and Ross began a romance.

Cornford possibly moved into Ross' apartment in the ensuing weeks while he recruited volunteers to return en masse with him to Spain. While living with Ross, Cornford published his first book of poems and worked on a translation of Lysistrata. If such a relationship occurred, this brief union was not to last due to their mutual commitment to fighting Franco in Spain.

War correspondent

Arrival in Republican Spain
In September 1936, Ross travelled to war-torn Spain either in the company of Claud Cockburn or separately. At this point, Cornford had returned to Spain with 21 British volunteers to fight the fascists and had become the de facto representative of the British contingent in the International Brigades. He served with a mitrailleuse unit, and fought in the Battle of Madrid in November and December 1936. During the subsequent battle for University City of Madrid, he was wounded by a stray anti-aircraft shell. Despite his injuries, he then served with the English-speaking volunteers of the Marseillaise Brigade and was killed in action at Lopera near Córdoba on 27 or 28 December.

Upon hearing of Cornford's death, Ross was devastated and may have attempted to kill herself with an overdose of sleeping pills. Decades later, she would confide to her acquaintance John Sommerfield during a personal conversation that Cornford "was the only man I ever loved". The death of Cornford and other friends in the service of the doomed Republican cause likely solidified Ross' anti-fascist sentiments, and she remained in Republican Spain throughout the prolonged conflict as a war correspondent for the Daily Express.

Journalist and propagandist 

Throughout the Spanish Civil War, Ross worked for the London branch office of the Espagne News-Agency ("Spanish News Agency"). During Ross' tenure in the organisation, the Espagne News-Agency was accused by journalist George Orwell of being a Stalinist apparatus that disseminated false propaganda to undermine anti-Stalinist factions on the Republican side of the Spanish Civil War. In particular, during the Barcelona May Days, when anarchist factions on the Republican side were annihilated by Stalinist-backed troops, the Espagne News-Agency and the Daily Worker published false claims saying the anarchists had been planning a coup and were secretly allied with the fascists and thus justified their extermination.

All of the agency's staff—including Ross—were loyal operatives of the Comintern apparatus, the international Communist organization that sought to create a worldwide Soviet republic. Ross' fellow Comintern propagandists included Hungarian journalist Arthur Koestler, Willy Forrest, Mildred Bennett of the Moscow Daily News, and Claud Cockburn.

Ross and Cockburn became closer as the civil war progressed. By this time, Cockburn was a prominent member of the British Communist Party. Within five years, he would become a leader of the Comintern in Western Europe. While covering the Spanish Civil War for the Daily Worker in 1936, Cockburn had joined the elite Fifth Regiment of the left-wing Republicanos battling the right-wing Nacionales and, when not fighting, he gave sympathetic coverage to the Communist Party.

While Cockburn fought with the Fifth Regiment, Ross served as a war correspondent for the Daily Express. When Cockburn was at the front lines, Ross ghost-wrote his columns for him, "imitating his style and filing it at the Daily Worker under his name while continuing to send her own reports to the Express". Ross was embedded with Republican defenders in Madrid.

Among the other foreign correspondents in besieged Madrid were Herbert Matthews of The New York Times, Ernest Hemingway of the North American Newspaper Alliance, Henry Tilton Gorrell of United Press International, and Martha Gellhorn of Collier's, as well as Josephine Herbst. Ross and other foreign correspondents often dined together in the ruined basement of Gran Via, the sole restaurant open in besieged Madrid during its relentless bombardment by fascist troops. Armed loyal sentries heavily guarded the basement restaurant and no-one was permitted entry without a press pass.

Reporting on the Southern Front 

In early 1937, as the civil war progressed, Ross, her friend Richard Mowrer of The Chicago Daily News—the step-son of Ernest Hemingway's first wife Hadley Richardson—and their guide Constancia de la Mora travelled to Andalusia to report on the southern front. Ross and Mowrer investigated and reported upon war-time conditions in Alicante, Málaga, and Jaén. A week before Ross' arrival, Jaén had been bombed by a squadron of German Junkers 52 aircraft. Amid the rubble, Ross reported on the death toll and interviewed survivors including mothers whose children had died in the bombardment. She then proceeded to Andújar where, amid the ongoing battle and machine-gun fire, she interviewed Colonel José Morales, a commander of the southern armies.

Following her interview with Morales, the convoy in which Ross was travelling faced recurrent enemy fire and later, during the evening, was bombed by a fascist air patrol. De la Mora recalled this bombing as one of the daily perils Ross and other pro-Republican journalists endured to report news from the front lines:

During her time in Andújar, Ross endured nine aerial bombardments by German Junkers and survived each despite the lack of air raid shelters. Recalling these events, Mora described Ross as a fearless reporter who had seemingly resigned herself to death and looked "as natural as possible" when the bombs fell. Her friends noted Ross "had a comforting air of calmness about her". Following her reporting in Andújar, Ross continued to report from the fronts at Córdoba and Extremadura. She continued reporting on the progress of the war, often from the front lines of the Republican forces, for the next year.

Fall of Madrid and return to England 

In late 1938, while pregnant with Cockburn's child, Ross witnessed the final months of the Siege of Madrid and endured aerial bombardment by Francoist forces. By the time the besieged city fell to the Nationalist armies on 28 March 1939, Ross had escaped to England. Her wartime experiences, especially the atrocities she witnessed and the friends she lost in combat, solidified her lifelong commitment to anti-fascist resistance.

Sixty days after the fall of Madrid, Ross gave birth to a daughter by Claud Cockburn. The child, Sarah Caudwell, who was born on 27 May 1939, was the only offspring of their union. Some sources say Ross did not marry Cockburn due to her political beliefs about women's emancipation, but under British law, Cockburn still was married to his first wife Hope Hale Davis; he could not marry Ross at that time without committing bigamy. Whether Ross knew Cockburn was still legally married to Davis is unknown. Several months before her daughter's birth, Ross filed a deed poll in which she changed her surname to Cockburn.

In 1938 or 1939, Cockburn entered into a clandestine relationship with Patricia Arbuthnot. In August 1939, Cockburn "walked out" on Ross and their newly-born child to live with Arbuthnot. Cockburn later omitted all mention of Ross from his memoirs. Following her abandonment by Cockburn, Ross did not have another recorded partner. She later told an acquaintance "having a man around was like having a crocodile in the bath".

Later life and death

Second World War and post-war years 

Shortly before the outbreak of the Second World War, Ross, her daughter Sarah, and her widowed mother Clara Caudwell moved to Hertfordshire. Ross became friends with Isherwood's old acquaintance Edward Upward and his wife Hilda Percival, both of whom were socialist in outlook. Upward later met Olive Mangeot through their attendance of Communist Party meetings and the two began an extramarital affair. Olive, whom Isherwood depicted as Marvey Scriven in The Memorial and as Madame Cheuret in Lions and Shadows, eventually separated from her husband Andre Mangeot and lived in the London suburbs at Gunter Grove, Barnet, where she invited Ross and her daughter Sarah to live with her.

For many years, Ross and Sarah lived as Olive's boarders in modest circumstances in Gunter Grove. Much like Ross, Mangeot had been an apolitical bohemian in her youth and transformed with age into a devout Stalinist who sold the Daily Worker and was an active member of various left-wing circles. According to Isherwood, Mangeot, Ross, and their social circle refused to consort with Trotskyites or other communist schismatics who had strayed from the Stalinist party line.

Parenthood, and socialist activities 
For the remainder of her adult life, Ross devoted herself to advancing the ideology of socialism and raising her daughter Sarah. To obtain the most advantageous education available for Sarah, Ross moved to Scotland. In 1960, they moved to Barnes, London, for Sarah to attend Oxford University. They lived with Jean's invalid sister Margaret "Peggy" Ross, a sculptor and painter who trained at the Liverpool School of Art. At this point, Ross acted as a caretaker for both  Peggy—who had severe arthritis affecting her mobility—and her ailing mother Clara, who had suffered a debilitating stroke. Under Ross' tutelage, Sarah became one of the first women to join the Oxford Union as a student and to speak in the Oxford Union's Debating Chamber. She went on to teach law at Oxford and became a senior executive at Lloyds Bank, and later a celebrated author of detective novels.

While Sarah was at Oxford, Ross continued to engage in political activities including protesting nuclear weapons, boycotting apartheid South Africa, and opposing the Vietnam War. Even in later life, she continued to sell copies of the Daily Worker to neighbouring houses and to raise awareness of ongoing political campaigns. Acquaintances who met Ross during the later decades of her life noted various hardships and impoverished economic circumstances had taken their toll on her. By this time, she had few clothes and very little money. Sommerfield said:

Ross and writer Isherwood met a final time shortly before her death. In a diary entry for 24 April 1970, Isherwood recounted their final reunion in London:

On 27 April 1973, Ross died at her home in Richmond, Surrey, aged 61, from cervical cancer. She was cremated at East Sheen.

Dislike of Sally Bowles and Cabaret 

According to Ross' daughter Sarah Caudwell, her mother detested her popular identification with the vacuous character Sally Bowles. She believed the character's political indifference more closely resembled Isherwood or his hedonistic friends, many of whom "fluttered around town exclaiming how sexy the storm troopers looked in their uniforms". Ross' opinion of Isherwood's beliefs is partly confirmed by Isherwood's biographer Peter Parker, who wrote Isherwood was "the least political" of W. H. Auden's social circle in Weimar Berlin, and Auden noted the young Isherwood "held no [political] opinions whatever about anything".

According to Caudwell, Ross further disliked the Sally Bowles character, which offended her feminist convictions. Isherwood's fictionalised depiction of Ross uses a literary convention that necessitated "a woman must be either virtuous (in the sexual sense) or a tart. So Sally, who is plainly not virtuous, must be a tart to depend for a living on providing sexual pleasure". Such a submissive gender role would have "seemed to [Ross] the ultimate denial of freedom and emancipation."

Above all, Ross resented Isherwood's 1937 novella Sally Bowles depiction of Ross expressing anti-Semitic bigotry. In the 1937 story, Bowles laments having sex with an "awful old Jew" to obtain money. Caudwell said such racial bigotry "would have been as alien to my mother's vocabulary as a sentence in Swahili; she had no more deeply rooted passion than a loathing of racialism and so, from the outset, of fascism." Due to her unyielding dislike of fascism, Ross was incensed Isherwood had depicted her as thoughtlessly allied in her beliefs "with the [racist] attitudes which led to Dachau and Auschwitz". In the early 21st century, some writers have argued the anti-Semitic remarks in Sally Bowles are a reflection of Isherwood's own much-documented prejudices. In Peter Parker's biography, he states: "Isherwood is revealed as being fairly anti-Semitic to a degree that required some emendations of the Berlin novels when they were republished after the war".

Isherwood never publicly confirmed Ross was his model for Sally Bowles until after her death. Other mutual acquaintances were less discreet. Ross said her former partner Claud Cockburn had leaked to his friends in the press she had inspired the character. In 1951, poet Stephen Spender in his autobiography World Within World publicly confirmed Bowles was based on a real person, and he also confirmed the novella's abortion incident is factual. Later, Gerald Hamilton, the inspiration for Isherwood's character Mr Norris, identified Ross as Sally Bowles due to a public feud with Cockburn. Consequently, when Cabaret garnered acclaim in the late 1960s, journalists—particularly those from the Daily Mail—tracked down Ross and hounded her with intrusive questions.

Ross refused to discuss her sexual misadventures in Weimar Berlin with journalists. Caudwell said the journalists' relentless questions "were invariably a disappointment on both sides: the journalists always wanted to talk about sex" while Ross "wanted to talk about politics". Ross noted reporters often claimed to seek knowledge "about Berlin in the Thirties" but they did not wish "to know about the unemployment or the poverty or the Nazis marching through the streets—all they want to know is how many men I went to bed with". Ross became angered when the reporters ascribed her many sexual affairs to her feminist beliefs: "They asked if I was a feminist. Well, of course I am, darling. But they don't think that feminism is about sex, do they? It's about economics".

Ross steadfastly declined invitations to watch Cabaret or any related adaptations. Her ambivalence towards the popular success of Cabaret was not unique among Isherwood's acquaintances: Stephen Spender said Cabaret glossed over Weimar Berlin's crushing poverty, and he later noted there was "not a single meal or club in the movie Cabaret that Christopher and I could have afforded". Both Spender and Ross often said Isherwood's stories glamourised and distorted the harsh realities of life in 1930s Berlin. According to Ross, Isherwood's "story was quite, quite different from what really happened". She nonetheless conceded the accuracy of the depiction of their social group of British expatriates as pleasure-seeking libertines: "We were all utterly against the bourgeois standards of our parents' generation. That's what took us to [Weimar-era] Berlin. The climate was freer there".

Portrayals and legacy

Isherwood canon 

Sally Bowles, the fictional character inspired by Jean Ross, has been portrayed by a number of actors; Julie Harris in I Am a Camera, the 1951 adaptation of Goodbye to Berlin and the 1955 film adaptation of the same name; Jill Haworth in the original 1966 Broadway production of Cabaret; Judi Dench in the original 1968 West-End stage version of Cabaret; Liza Minnelli in Bob Fosse's 1972 film adaptation of the musical, and Natasha Richardson in the 1998 Broadway revival of Cabaret.

In 1979, critic Howard Moss noted the resilience of the Sally Bowles character: "It is almost fifty years since Sally Bowles shared the recipe for a Prairie oyster with Herr Issyvoo in a vain attempt to cure a hangover" and yet the character in subsequent permutations lives on "from story to play to movie to musical to movie-musical". Moss ascribed the character's continuing appeal to the aura of sophisticated innocence that pervades Isherwood's depiction of the character and of Weimar Berlin in which "the unseemly and the ugly" are either de-emphasised or made to appear genial to the spectator.

According to critic Ingrid Norton, Sally Bowles later inspired Holly Golightly in Truman Capote's novella Breakfast at Tiffany's. Norton has said Isherwood's Bowles was the key model for Capote's Golightly character, and that both scenes and dialogue in Capote's 1958 novella have direct equivalencies in Isherwood's 1937 work. Capote, who admired Isherwood's novels, had befriended Isherwood in New York in the late 1940s.

Christopher and His Kind (2011) 

In 2011, British actor Imogen Poots portrayed Jean Ross in Christopher and His Kind, in which she starred opposite Matt Smith as Christopher Isherwood. For her performance, Poots attempted to show Ross' personality as "convincingly fragile beneath layers of attitude" but did not wish to depict Ross as a talented singer. Poots said if "Jean had been that good, she wouldn't have been wasting her time hanging around with Isherwood in the cabarets of the Weimar Republic, she would have been on her way, perhaps, to the life she dreamed of in Hollywood".

These Foolish Things 

As well as inspiring Sally Bowles, Ross has been credited as the inspiration for one of the 20th century's most-enduring popular songs, "These Foolish Things (Remind Me of You)". Although its composer Eric Maschwitz's wife Hermione Gingold said her autobiography the song was written for either herself or actor Anna May Wong, Maschwitz's own autobiography contradicts that of Gingold. Maschwitz cites "fleeting memories of [a] young love" as the inspiration for the song, and most sources—including the Oxford Dictionary of National Biography—say cabaret singer Ross, with whom Maschwitz had a youthful romantic liaison, was the muse for the song.

References

Notes

Citations

Works cited

Print sources 

 
 
 
 
 
 
 
 
 
 
 
 
 
 
 
 
 
 
 
 
 
 
 
 
 
 
 
 
 
 
 
 
 
 
 
 
 
 
 
 
 
 
 
 
 
  Although an autobiographical work disguised as a novel, John Sommerfield's The Imprinted draws upon factual relationships and events that occurred among British socialist enclaves in the 1930s. As such, Sommerfield's friendship with Ross and Cornford is likely factual, although any relationship between Ross and Cornford is unconfirmed.

Online sources 

 
 
 
 
* 
 
 
  Frost's article is more or less a summary of the Oxford National Biography article by Peter Parker.

External links 
 
 Jean Ross – CounterPunch Profile counterpunch.org; accessed 8 July 2014.
 Jean Ross – Oxford Dictionary of National Biography Profile, oxforddnb.com; accessed 8 July 2014.

1911 births
1973 deaths
English people of Scottish descent
People from Alexandria
British communists
British expatriates in Germany
British women singers
British writers
British film critics
British women film critics
Deaths from cervical cancer
Nightclub performers
20th-century English singers
20th-century English women singers
People associated with RADA
British socialist feminists
Deaths from cancer in England
British expatriates in Egypt